FC Tavriya Novotroitske is a Ukrainian football club from Novotroitske, Kherson Oblast.

The clubs exists since 1936. Beside football competitions in Kherson Oblast, the club also participates in friendly competition organized by SC Tavriya Simferopol, the Open Cup of AR Crimea Football Federation. Prior to the start of the 2020–21 Ukrainian Second League the club merged with SC Tavriya Simferopol, this fusion continued to play under the original name of SC Tavriya Simferopol (in the 2020–21 Ukrainian Second League season).

Honours
 Football championship of Kherson Oblast
 Winners (7): 1990, 1992, 1993, 1994, 1996, 2011, 2013
 Football cup of Kherson Oblast
 Winners (9): 1951, 1962, 1992, 1994, 1997, 1998, 2001, 2010, 2013

League and cup history

{|class="wikitable"
|-bgcolor="#efefef"
! Season
! Div.
! Pos.
! Pl.
! W
! D
! L
! GS
! GA
! P
!Domestic Cup
!colspan=2|Europe
!Notes
|}

Coaches
 Igor Gamula (2000)

References

 
Tavriya Novotroitsk, FC
Football clubs in Kherson Oblast